Jens Glücklich (born 10 July 1966) is a German former cyclist who, prior to the German reunification, competed for East Germany. He competed in the track time trial at the 1992 Summer Olympics.

References

External links
 

1966 births
Living people
German male cyclists
Olympic cyclists of Germany
Cyclists at the 1992 Summer Olympics
Sportspeople from Cottbus
Cyclists from Brandenburg
East German male cyclists
People from Bezirk Cottbus